Gerald Gadit (born 16 May 1999) is a Malaysian professional footballer who plays for Malaysia Super League club Kelantan on loan from Sabah.

Gerald has been called by coach of the national under-23 football team, Brad Maloney for the 2022 AFF U-23 Championship.

Club career 
In 2021, Gerald who plays for the Piala Presiden Sabah squad was called to join the senior squad of Sabah F.C. in the Malaysia Super League.

International career 
In January 2022, Gerald was called up to the national under-23 team, led by Brad Maloney, as the 2022 AFF U-23 Championship starts in February 2022 that was held in Phnom Penh, Cambodia.

Career statistics

Club

Honours

International
Malaysia U-19
 AFF U-19 Youth Championship : 2018

References 

1999 births
Living people
Sabah F.C. (Malaysia) players
Kelantan F.C. players
Malaysian footballers